Julia Olmos Peñuela (born 12 September 1983) is a Spanish former football defender.

Early and personal life
Born in Valencia, Olmos grew up practising many sports, including ballet and tennis. In July 2003, she was poised to enrol on the Erasmus Programme at the University of Nottingham but declined this as she accepted a contract at Italian club Lazio instead. As of 2019, she is a professor at the University of Valencia, working in the economics faculty.

Club career
Olmos was a member of the first ever Levante women's squad. Throughout her career she played for Levante and Colegio Alemán in Spain's Superliga Femenina and Lazio in Italy's Serie A. Olmos was the second Spanish player to play for Lazio after Conchi Sánchez, who had three separate spells at the club. She retired in 2009 at 25.

International career
She was an Under-19 international (2000–2001 and 2001–2002).

References

1983 births
Living people
Spanish women's footballers
Primera División (women) players
Levante UD Femenino players
Spanish expatriate women's footballers
Serie A (women's football) players
S.S. Lazio Women 2015 players
Valencia CF Femenino players
Expatriate women's footballers in Italy
Spanish expatriate sportspeople in Italy
Footballers from the Valencian Community
Women's association football defenders